Harold Hill (24 September 1899 – 1969) was an English professional footballer who played in the Football League for Chesterfield, Mansfield Town, Notts County and The Wednesday.

References

1899 births
1969 deaths
English footballers
Association football forwards
English Football League players
Notts County F.C. players
Sheffield Wednesday F.C. players
Scarborough F.C. players
Chesterfield F.C. players
Mansfield Town F.C. players
Ashfield United F.C. players